USS Kennebec may refer to the following ships of the United States Navy:

 , a gunboat, launched in 1861, commissioned in 1862 and sold in 1865.
 , an oiler, commissioned in 1942 and struck in 1976.

See also 
 List of current ships of the United States Navy

United States Navy ship names